Ehrwald is a municipality in the district of Reutte in the Austrian state of Tyrol.

Geography
Ehrwald lies at the southern base of the Zugspitze (2950 meters above sea level), Germany's highest mountain, but which is shared with Austria. The town is connected to the Zugspitze with the Tyrolean Aerial Tramway.

Climate
Ehrwald has a humid continental climate (Dfb) with four distinct seasons. Summers are very pleasant, with mild to warm days and cool nights. Winters are relatively cold and snowy, with average annual snowfall totalling 128 inches (325 cm). Precipitation is very reliable year round, but markedly more so during the summer months.

References

External links

Cities and towns in Reutte District